Kate "Katie" Roberts (born 20 June 1983) is a South African triathlete who competed in the 2008 Summer Olympics and 2012 Summer Olympics.

She was born in Bloemfontein.

In 2008, she finished 32nd in the Olympic triathlon event.

In 2012, she finished 22nd in the Olympic triathlon event.

External links
 profile
 home page

1983 births
Living people
Sportspeople from Bloemfontein
South African people of British descent
South African female triathletes
Olympic triathletes of South Africa
Triathletes at the 2008 Summer Olympics
Triathletes at the 2012 Summer Olympics
Triathletes at the 2014 Commonwealth Games
Commonwealth Games medallists in triathlon
Commonwealth Games silver medallists for South Africa
20th-century South African women
21st-century South African women
Medallists at the 2014 Commonwealth Games